The 2003–04 season was Liverpool's 112th season in existence and their 42nd consecutive year in the top-flight. This article covers the period from 1 July 2003 to 30 May 2004. Liverpool finished the FA Premier League season in fourth place.

Season summary
Liverpool finished the season in fourth position in the Premier League in what was to be Gérard Houllier's last in charge of Liverpool. He was replaced by Rafael Benítez at the end of the season after six years in charge.

Final league table

Results summary

Big Four games

Players

First-team squad

Left club during season

Reserve squad
The following players did not appear for the first team this season.

Transfers

In

Out

 In:  £6,500,000
 Out:  £6,250,000
 Total spending:  £250,000

Match results

Premier League

Results by round

FA Cup

League Cup

UEFA Cup

Statistics

Appearances and goals

|-
! colspan=14 style=background:#dcdcdc; text-align:center| Goalkeepers

|-
! colspan=14 style=background:#dcdcdc; text-align:center| Defenders

|-
! colspan=14 style=background:#dcdcdc; text-align:center| Midfielders

|-
! colspan=14 style=background:#dcdcdc; text-align:center| Forwards

|-
! colspan=14 style=background:#dcdcdc; text-align:center| Players transferred out during the season

Top scorers

Notes

References

2003-2004
Liverpool